Fisherman's Friend is a brand of strong menthol lozenges manufactured by the Lofthouse company in Fleetwood, Lancashire, England.

History 
Fisherman's Friend was originally developed by pharmacist James Lofthouse in 1865 to relieve various respiratory problems suffered by fishermen working in the extreme conditions of the northern deep-sea fishing grounds. Though he developed it as an extremely strong liquid remedy containing menthol and eucalyptus oil, Lofthouse later made the liquid into small lozenges, which were easier to transport and administer.  According to the manufacturer, the fishermen began to refer to the lozenges as "friends", hence the name. The company expanded its reach after the 1963 marriage of Doreen and Tony Lofthouse, a grandson of the founder, following which Doreen became a director; it transitioned from direct sales to stocking by retailers and subsequently spread abroad, initially to Norway in 1974, and different flavours were added to appeal to regional tastes. The shape of the lozenges was reportedly based on the buttons of a dress worn by Mrs Lofthouse.

British prime minister Margaret Thatcher is said to have used the product when her throat became strained from public speaking. French president Emmanuel Macron uses them too: "He finds his energy in les Fisherman's, those lozenges which rip your throat out. He keeps them in his pockets and in the car-seats. When speaking publicly, he needs water, some slices of lemon and a small dish of Fisherman's. During the Presidential campaign, he literally devoured crates of them, delivered to his campaign headquarters."

The lozenges are relatively unchanged since their creation. The original paper packets later became foil-lined and packaged in a cardboard carton.

Lofthouse of Fleetwood has won the Queen's Award to Industry for Export Achievement on three occasions.

Ingredients 

Original extra strong lozenges contain sugar, liquorice extract, menthol, peppermint oil, eucalyptus oil, dextrin, tragacanth, and capsicum tincture.

The sugar-free versions of the lozenges contain sorbitol, aspartame, menthol, vegetable-sourced sucralose, and acesulfame K. Often they have anti-caking agents added such as magnesium stearate. Each different flavour has unique ingredients. For example, the blackcurrant flavour variant includes elderberry juice extract.

Availability 

Fisherman's Friends are available in a variety of flavours. Some flavours are sugar-free, for which the bags are striped.

Containing sugar 
 Original Extra Strong (called Eucalyptus in Germany) – White pack
 Aniseed – Gold pack
 Mint – Green pack

Sugar-free 
 Original Extra Strong (called Eucalyptus in Germany) – White and blue pack
 Lemon – White and yellow pack
 Blackcurrant – White and dark purple pack
 Mint – White and light green pack
 Apple – White, green and orange pack (only in Indonesia)
 Apple and Cinnamon – White and mid-green, or white and moss green, or white, green and orange pack
 Salmiak – White and black pack
 Cherry – White and dark red pack
 Mandarin and Ginger, or Spicy Mandarin, or Mandarin and Grapefruit, or Mandarin, or Orange Spice – White and dark orange pack
 Grapefruit – White and coral pack
 Sweet Liquorice – White and brown pack
 Tropical – White and amber pack
 Spearmint – White and teal pack
 Citrus – White and lime green pack
 Honey and Lemon – White and beige pack
 Sweet Lime – White and yellow to light green pack
 Raspberry – White and dark pink pack
 Mixed Berries – White, red and purple pack
 Sage – White and light purple pack (only in Germany)
 Salmiak and Raspberry – White, dark pink and black pack (only in Finland, Sweden and Norway)

Chocolate Mint 
Chocolate Mint flavours:
 Chocolate Mint
 Chocolate Mint Cherry
 Chocolate Mint Orange
 Chocolate Mint Salted Caramel

Other flavours of sweets 
 Pro Fresh from Fisherman's Friend 
 Vanilla Mint
 Peppermint
 Strawberry
 Blueberry
 Lemon And Lime
 Melon
 Orange

Notes

See also 
 Apteekin Salmiakki
 List of breath mints
 Victory V
 Vigroids

References

External links 
  (for the UK)

British confectionery
Throat lozenges
British brands
Fleetwood
1865 introductions
Liquorice (confectionery)
Brand name confectionery